Zhongda may refer to:

 Zhongda Township (Zhòngdáxiāng) in Yushu County, Qinghai, in China
 Zhongshan University (Zhōngshān Dàxué), abbreviated as "Zhongda" in Chinese
 Chinese University of Hong Kong (Xiānggǎng Zhōngwén Dàxué), abbreviated as "Zhongda" in (Mandarin) Chinese
 Zhongda, the style name of Sima Yi, Cao Wei's general during China's Three Kingdoms period